Vengayam is a Tamil language film written and directed by Sankagiri Rajkumar. Sathyaraj plays a guest role as himself in the film and Alexander- VJ and Pavina Joel in lead roles. The music of the film was composed by Bharani and cinematography performed by Rahu. The film released to very low profile on 19 August 2011. Later it was re-released on 23 March 2012.

Cast 
"Makkal TV" Alexander as Anbumani
Pavina Joel
Sathyaraj as himself (guest appearance)
Sankagiri Rajkumar
Kalki
Eazhaventhan
Thangaraj
Azhagappan

Plot 
The film revolves around fake godmen in a village.

Soundtrack 

The lyrics were penned by Arivumathi, Suba.Veerapandian and Manickam.S.M. The background score was composed by Ram Sasi.

Reception
The movie was critically acclaimed but commercially failed. The Times of India wrote " The film pretty much follows the formula of vigilante films but brings a couple of new things to the table — for one, the protagonists are hardly ones you would expect in such a film." Rohit Ramachandran of Nowrunning.com rated it 3/5 calling it a good attempt. Sify's Moviebuzz rated it good. Indiglitz called Vengayam an attempt to trigger awareness. However, Behindwoods Review Board called it "More than just trivialities"

References

External links

2011 films
2010s Tamil-language films